The Dillberg is a hill in Bavaria, Germany.

Hills of Bavaria
Mountains and hills of the Franconian Jura